Simon Touzil (born 9 July 1972) is a former professional tennis player from Germany.

Biography
Touzil is the only child of Czechoslovakian immigrants, who came to West Germany four years prior to his birth. He played tennis from the age of three and was a top ten junior in West Germany in the 1980s.

As a professional player he competed mostly on the satellite and Challenger circuits, with his matches including wins over Rainer Schuettler and Franco Squillari. He was runner-up to Dimitri Poliakov at the 1993 Bruck Challenger and lost two Challenger finals in doubles. His only ATP Tour main draw appearance came in the doubles at the 1996 XL Bermuda Open, where he partnered with Nicolas Lapentti to make the semi-finals.

References

External links
 
 

1972 births
Living people
German male tennis players
German people of Czech descent
Sportspeople from Offenbach am Main
Tennis people from Hesse